KTUZ (1570 AM) is a radio station broadcasting a regional Mexican format. The station is licensed to serve the community of Catoosa, Oklahoma and serves the Tulsa area. The station is owned by Ty and Tony Tyler, through licensee Tyler Media LLC.

The station was assigned the call letters KTUZ by the Federal Communications Commission on October 5, 2015.

Translators

References

External links

TUZ
TUZ